Kemuyama Dam  is an earthfill dam located in Iwate Prefecture in Japan. The dam is used for flood control and irrigation. The catchment area of the dam is 10.8 km2. The dam impounds about 28  ha of land when full and can store 1410 thousand cubic meters of water. The construction of the dam was completed in 1967.

See also
List of dams in Japan

References

Dams in Iwate Prefecture